was a Japanese film and television director, producer, and cinematographer. The eldest son of Eiji Tsuburaya, he began his career on the 1954 film, Godzilla and its sequel, Godzilla Raids Again as an assistant special effects cinematographer.

Early career 
In 1959, Tsuburaya joined TBS Television as a production director.

Tsuburaya Productions 
In 1970, Tsuburaya left TBS due to the death of his father and became president of Tsuburaya Productions. Having financial difficulties, the company was in a critical business situation. Declaring he couldn't serve as president and director at the same time, he became a producer. As a producer in 1970, he produced Ultra Fight. This popularity led to the demand for full-scale special effects programs in 1971 when he produced Return of Ultraman and Mirrorman, bringing about a second giant boom.

Partial filmography

Director 

 Kemuri no Osama (1962)
 Ultra Q (1965)
 Ultraman (1966)
 Ultraman (1967)
 Ultra Seven (1967)
 Operation: Mystery! (1968)

Lyricist 

 Return of Ultraman (1971) - "Return of Ultraman" / "Kaiju Ondo" [as Kyoichi Azuma]
 Mirrorman (1971) - "Song of Mirrorman" / "Song of SGM" / "Fight! Mirrorman" [as Kyoichi Azuma]

Assistant director 

 Cartero Carlos Fly to Japan (1963)

Special effects director 

 Ultraman (1966)

Producer 

 Ultra Fight (1970)
 Return of Ultraman (1971)
Mirrorman (1971)
 Daigoro vs. Goliath (1972)

Assistant special effects cinematographer 

 Godzilla (1954) [with various]
 Godzilla Raids Again (1955) [with various]

Interviewee 
The Father of Ultra Q (1966)

References

Notes

External links 

 

1931 births
1973 deaths
Japanese film producers
Japanese film directors
Japanese television producers
Tsuburaya Productions
Ultra Series